The 1863 Hampden by-election was a by-election held  on 2 July 1863 in the  electorate during the 3rd New Zealand Parliament.

The by-election was caused by the resignation of the incumbent, John Richard Jones.

Frederick Wayne was declared elected unopposed, as he was the only candidate nominated.

References 

Hampden 1863
1863 elections in New Zealand
July 1863 events
Politics of Otago